Mungara Yamini Krishnamurthy (born 20 December 1940) is an Indian dancer of Bharatanatyam and Kuchipudi styles of dancing.

Early life
Yamini Krishnamurthy was born in Madanapalli, Chittoor District, Andhra Pradesh. She was brought up in Chidambaram, Tamil Nadu.

Career
Yamini Krishnamurthy debuted in 1957 in Madras. She has the honour of being Asthana Nartaki (resident dancer) of the Tirumala Tirupati Devasthanam. She was also known as "torch bearer" of Kuchipudi form of dance.

She imparts dance lessons to younger dancers at her institute, Yamini School of Dance, Hauz Khas, New Delhi.

Autobiography
She released her autobiography, "A Passion For Dance", a book well received by the readers.

Awards
Her dancing career brought her many awards, including the Padma Shree (1968) Padma Bhushan (2001), and Padma Vibhushan (2016), which are among the highest civilian awards of the Republic of India. She was honoured with "Natya Shastra" award by Shambhavi School of Dance at "Nayika-Excellence Personified" on the occasion of Women's Day on 8 March 2014. She gave a lecture demonstration on "Contribution of Woman to Kuchipudi". She also released a Kuchipudi Dance DVD featuring Prateeksha Kashi who is the daughter of Kuchipudi Dansuse Smt.Vyjayanthi Kashi, artistic director of Shambhavi.

Quotes

 'A dancer must have tremendous personality. A God like Christ and even a godman like Rajneesh had some personality. Combination of talent, dedication, creativity and being emotive is imperative. A coupling of these four qualities with technique is essential. Monotony is deterrent as it regards your style and I notice today, that new dancers perform in a startlingly similar fashion.'
 'The past has been exciting, the present extremely challenging. As for the future, it holds a lot of promise and many surprises. And I cannot wait to unravel them!'
 On remaining unmarried, she said 'Marriage did not happen because it was not meant to be. As for children, all my disciples are my children.'

References

External links

Indian female classical dancers
Performers of Indian classical dance
Dancers from Andhra Pradesh
Kuchipudi exponents
Telugu people
People from Chittoor district
1940 births
Living people
Bharatanatyam exponents
Recipients of the Sangeet Natak Akademi Award
Recipients of the Sangeet Natak Akademi Fellowship
Recipients of the Padma Vibhushan in arts
Recipients of the Padma Bhushan in arts
Recipients of the Padma Shri in arts
20th-century Indian dancers
20th-century Indian women artists
Women artists from Andhra Pradesh